The Iraq women's national handball team is the national team of Iraq. It is governed by the Iraqi Handball Federation and takes part in international handball competitions.

Competition record

West Asian Women's Handball Championship
 2016:  
 2017: 6th

Results in West Asian Women's Handball Championship

2016 West Asian Women's Handball Championship
"Qatar win West Asian Women Handball Championship title"

2017 West Asian Women's Handball Championship
"JORDAN TO HOST REGIONAL HANDBALL TOURNAMENT".

References

External links
 http://www.asianhandball.org/index.php?lang=en
 Iraqi Handball Federation

Establishments in Iraq
Women's national handball teams
H